The 7th Parliament of Singapore was a meeting of the Parliament of Singapore. Its first session commenced on 9 January 1989 and was prorogued on 21 April 1990. Its second session commenced on 7 June 1990 and was prorogued on 29 January 1991. It commenced its third session on 22 February 1991 and was dissolved on 14 August 1991.

The members of the 7th Parliament were elected in the 1988 general election. Parliament was controlled by a People's Action Party majority, led by Prime Minister Lee Kuan Yew who subsequently handed over to Goh Chok Tong. The Speaker was Tan Soo Khoon. The de facto Leader of the Opposition was Chiam See Tong of the Singapore Democratic Party.

Officeholders 

 Speaker: Tan Soo Khoon (PAP)
 Deputy Speaker: 
 Lim Boon Heng (PAP), from 16 January 1989
 Abdullah Tarmugi (PAP), from 16 January 1989
 Prime Minister: 
 Lee Kuan Yew (PAP), until 28 November 1990
 Goh Chok Tong (PAP), from 28 November 1990
 Deputy Prime Minister:
 Goh Chok Tong (PAP), until 28 November 1990
 Ong Teng Cheong (PAP)
 Lee Hsien Loong (PAP), from 28 November 1990
 Leader of the Opposition: Chiam See Tong (SDP)
 Leader of the House: Wong Kan Seng (PAP)
 Party Whip of the People's Action Party: Lee Boon Yang
 Deputy Party Whip of the People's Action Party: Ho Kah Leong

Composition

Members

Elected members 
This is the list of members of the 7th Parliament of Singapore elected in the 1988 general election.

Non-Constituency Members of Parliament 
Two Non-constituency Member of Parliament seats were allocated in the 6th Parliament of Singapore.

Nominated Members of Parliament 
The Nominated Members of Parliament scheme came into force on 10 September 1990 with the first NMPs being appointed on 22 November 1990.

 Maurice Choo, from 22 November 1990
 Leong Chee Whye, from 22 November 1990

Vacant seats

Reference

Parliament of Singapore